Heterochromatin protein 1, binding protein 3 is a protein that in humans is encoded by the HP1BP3 gene. It has been identified as a novel subtype of the linker histone H1, involved in the structure of heterochromatin

Model organisms 

Model organisms have been used in the study of HP1BP3 function. A conditional knockout mouse line, called Hp1bp3tm1a(EUCOMM)Wtsi was generated as part of the International Knockout Mouse Consortium program — a high-throughput mutagenesis project to generate and distribute animal models of disease to interested scientists — at the Wellcome Trust Sanger Institute. Male and female animals underwent a standardized phenotypic screen to determine the effects of deletion. Twenty three tests were carried out and six significant phenotypes were reported. Fewer homozygous mutant embryos were identified during gestation than predicted by Mendelian ratio.  Homozygous mutant female adults had decreased body weight, heart weight and bone mineral density, and increased blood urea levels and T cell number.

HP1BP3 deficiency in mice results in severe dwarfism and impaired bone mass, caused by altered endocrine IGF-1 signaling. The gene is highly expressed in the brain and a number of behavioral phenotypes have been described for the mice. Lack of HP1BP3 led to impaired maternal behavior and reduced anxiety, leading to a dramatic reduction in litter survival. This may be related to the connection between HP1BP3 and postpartum depression in humans. Finally, HP1BP3 has been implicated in Alzheimer's disease..

References

Further reading 
 
 
 
 
 
 
 

Genes mutated in mice